Pulsifer may refer to:

People
 Addison G. Pulsifer, American architect
 David Pulsifer, American historian
 Joseph Perkins Pulsifer, founding citizen of Beaumont, Texas
 Simon Pulsifer, Wikipedia editor
 Harold Trowbridge Pulsifer, American poet and magazine editor

Fictional Characters
 Newton Pulsifer, a character in the 1990 novel Good Omens

Supreme Court of the United States 

 Pulsifer v. United States, a court case during the 2023-2024 October term of the Supreme Court of the United States

Other uses 

 Erythranthe pulsiferae, a plant also known as Pulsifer's monkeyflower